Sharon Vandromme (born 2 October 1983) is a road cyclist from Belgium. She represented her nation at the 2004 Summer Olympics in the Women's road race. She also competed at the 2003, 2004 and 2006 UCI Road World Championships.

References

External links
 profile at Procyclingstats.com

1983 births
Belgian female cyclists
Living people
Place of birth missing (living people)
Olympic cyclists of Belgium
Cyclists at the 2004 Summer Olympics
People from Roeselare
Cyclists from West Flanders